The 2003 Winter European Youth Olympic Winter Festival was an international multi-sport event held between 25 and 31 January 2003, in Bled, Slovenia.

Sports

Medalists

Alpine skiing

Biathlon

Cross-country skiing

Figure skating

Ice hockey

Nordic combined

Ski jumping

Medal table

External links
 Results

European Youth Olympic Winter Festival
European Youth Olympic Winter Festival
European Youth Olympic Winter Festival
European Youth Olympic Winter Festival
International sports competitions hosted by Slovenia
Youth sport in Slovenia
European Youth Olympic Winter Festival
European Youth Olympic Winter Festival
Sport in Bled